Antonio "Toni" Rodríguez Dovale (born 4 April 1990) is a Spanish professional footballer who plays as a left winger for Coruxo FC.

Club career

Celta
Dovale was born in A Coruña, Galicia, playing youth football with FC Barcelona amongst other clubs. Aged 19, he made his professional debut with local RC Celta de Vigo, starting in a 1–2 Segunda División home loss against CD Numancia on 29 August 2009. He started his career as a winger.

In the 2011–12 season, after a brief loan spell with SD Huesca of the same tier, Dovale contributed 30 games (only nine starts, 1.141 minutes of action) and two goals to help his team to return to La Liga after an absence of five years. He made his debut in the competition on 18 August 2012, coming on as a late substitute in the 0–1 home defeat to Málaga CF.

Even though his future seemed uncertain at Celta following the appointment of coach Luis Enrique in summer 2013, Dovale managed to remain with the club, being successfully reconverted into left-back in the process. However, he eventually became surplus to requirements, with even right-footed Jonny being played in his position.

Sporting KC
On 11 March 2014, Dovale signed with Sporting Kansas City of Major League Soccer. He made his debut for his new team on 5 April, playing the last ten minutes of the 0–0 home draw against Real Salt Lake.

Dovale scored his first goal in the competition on 27 May 2014, in a 1–1 draw with the New York Red Bulls also at Children's Mercy Park. His contract expired on 31 December and was not renewed.

Lugo
On 29 January 2015, Dovale signed a six-month deal with second-tier CD Lugo. He was an ever-present figure during his spell, starting in 16 of his league appearances and scoring his first goal on 22 March to help defeat Deportivo Alavés 3–2 at home.

Later years
On 10 July 2015, Dovale moved to CD Leganés in the same league after agreeing to a one-year contract. Roughly two years later, he left Rayo Vallecano and signed a one-year deal with Indian Super League club Bengaluru FC.

On 9 September 2018, Dovale joined Cypriot First Division side Nea Salamis Famagusta FC. On 10 December, he returned to India after transferring to East Bengal Club on a loan deal.

In July 2019, the 29-year-old Dovale moved clubs and countries again, signing a four-month contract with Thai League 2 club Royal Thai Navy FC. Following a spell in the Hong Kong Premier League with Eastern Sports Club, he returned to both his homeland and his native region in October 2022 after joining Coruxo FC of the Segunda Federación.

Personal life
Dovale was a trained pharmacist, and worked at his family's pharmacy in La Coruna during the coronavirus pandemic of 2020.

Career statistics

References

External links

1990 births
Living people
Spanish footballers
Footballers from A Coruña
Association football defenders
Association football wingers
Association football utility players
La Liga players
Segunda División players
Segunda División B players
Segunda Federación players
Celta de Vigo B players
RC Celta de Vigo players
SD Huesca footballers
CD Lugo players
CD Leganés players
Rayo Vallecano players
CD El Ejido players
Coruxo FC players
Major League Soccer players
Sporting Kansas City players
Indian Super League players
I-League players
Bengaluru FC players
East Bengal Club players
Nea Salamis Famagusta FC players
Toni Dovale
Toni Dovale
Hong Kong Premier League players
Eastern Sports Club footballers
Spanish expatriate footballers
Expatriate soccer players in the United States
Expatriate footballers in India
Expatriate footballers in Cyprus
Expatriate footballers in Thailand
Expatriate footballers in Hong Kong
Spanish expatriate sportspeople in the United States
Spanish expatriate sportspeople in India
Spanish expatriate sportspeople in Cyprus
Spanish expatriate sportspeople in Thailand
Spanish expatriate sportspeople in Hong Kong